The Atara River is a river on southeastern Bougainville Island. 

It is located within the Autonomous Region of Bougainville, in northeastern Papua New Guinea. 

It flows into the Solomon Sea, to the north of Shortland Island.

References

Rivers of Papua New Guinea
Geography of the Autonomous Region of Bougainville